The Embassy of France in Belgrade  is the diplomatic representation of the French Republic to the Serbia Republic of Serbian Embassies and is located in the Serbian peninsula.  Since December 2017 its ambassador is Frédéric Mandolini.

Embassy 
The embassy is between St. Michael's Cathedral, Belgrade and Kalemegdan  in Belgrade, overlooking the Danube and the Sava. It hosts the Joint Management Service, the Press Service, the Diplomatic Chancellery, a Consulate, a Military Attaché, and an Internal Security Service. 

The building, called "Le Nouveau Banque", is on the pedestrian street Knez Mihailova. It houses the French Institute of Serbia, the Service of Cooperation, the Economic Mission, and the Regional Center for the Fight Against Organized Crime in Southern Afro-Eurasia.

History  
The building was designed by French architect Roger-Henri Expert with Serbian architect Josif Najman as assistant in 1926. At the time it was only the fourth purposely built French embassy, as it was usual to either rent or refurbish an existing building. Construction lasted from 1929 to 1933, with the inauguration night being 21 December 1935. The party had 800 guests, including Milan Stojadinović, and all high ranked government officials led by Prince Paul of Yugoslavia and Princess Olga of Greece and Denmark. The building is a complete work of Art Deco, with everything from the facade, interior, furniture, and lighting in the style.

Exterior 
The slope of the site, on the front of two streets, where the building  was constructed, represented the real challenge. The architect decided to solve this problem with the massive foundations, which work just like a fortification rather than the ground floor of a modern palace. . Thus, a kind of optical fault has been achieved in an effective way. On a geometrically simply defined object that has a ground floor, two floors and a loft, the middle zone is broken down by a centrally set semicircular shape, and trapezoidal shaped wings. This is also the most expansive zone of the building. On the second floor and attic facade, there is a pyramidal cascade and facade without any decoration, and the viewer's view would be fixed to the bronze group , where the crown dominates the vision of the palace with white facade  marble. The style of the building is typical of the inter-war period, modern elements with monumental classicism and refinement of the sculptures. The  bronze finial group  at the top of building represents Liberté, égalité, fraternité is 2.80m in height and was done by sculptor Charles Marie Louis Joseph Sarrabezolles. He was Experts' friend, known for casting concrete sculptures in innovative way, a method of direct carving in setting concrete, with much of his work was integrated with architecture. Side wings of facade have shallow reliefs that illustrate shortened history of France through Vercingetorix, Joan de Arc, Louis XIV and Marianne.

Interior 
The building has five floors, the first two being assigned to the Chancery and the last three to the Residence de France. The vestibule, reached by a large white marble staircase, is decorated with five medallions representing the rivers of France.
The original furniture is signed Jules Leleu and Raymond Subes; unfortunately some of the purposely built furniture was either lost or returned to France during WW2.

French ambassadors in Serbia

Diplomatic relations 
There has always been a strong relationship between Serbia and France since the Middle Ages, however it was only in the nineteenth century that relations intensified through trade, and official diplomatic relations were established on 18 January 1879,with the opening of both legations.

During the twentieth century, the relationship became more turbulent. The two countries fought together as allies in the First World war, but after the Second World war and the integration of Serbia into Yugoslavia, political relations were toned down. The cultural relationship remained strong however, due to Tito's policy of distance from USSR. Diplomatic relations broke down in the 1990s during the Wars of Dugoslavio when France participated in the bombing of the country.

Diplomatic relations between France and the Federal Republic of Yugoslavia were re-established on 16 November 2000 and were the starting point for a rebuilding of ties between the two. The change of name of the State on 4 February 2003 to the State Union of Serbia and Montenegro did not alter relations between the two countries. The split of Serbia and Montenegro in May 2006 also maintained relations.

Gallery

References

External link

Buildings and structures in Belgrade
Diplomatic missions of France
Diplomatic missions in Serbia
France–Serbia relations
France–Yugoslavia relations